The following is a list of notable deaths in July 2007.

Entries for each day are listed alphabetically by surname. A typical entry lists information in the following sequence:
 Name, age, country of citizenship at birth, subsequent country of citizenship (if applicable), reason for notability, cause of death (if known), and reference.

July 2007

1
Joerg Kalt, 40, Austrian cinematographer, suicide.
Colleen McCrory, 57, Canadian environmental activist, brain cancer.
David Ritcheson, 18, American hate crime victim, suicide by jumping.
Gerhard Skrobek, 85, German sculptor of Hummel figurines, complications of heart surgery.

2
Philip Booth, 81, American poet and educator, complications from Alzheimer's disease.
Robert "Buck" Brown, 71, American cartoonist, created Playboy's "Granny" character, stroke.
Brahim Déby, 27, Chadian son of the national President and former presidential advisor, chemical asphyxiation.
Howell M. Estes II, 92, American Air Force general during the Vietnam War, heart ailment.
Ray Goins, 71, American bluegrass musician.
Robert Keeton, 88, American District Court judge, professor at Harvard Law School, complications from pulmonary embolism.
Peter Lyman, 66, American information researcher, brain cancer.
John Pinches, 91, British rower and soldier.
Dilip Sardesai, 66, Indian cricketer, multiple organ failure.
Beverly Sills, 78, American opera singer, lung cancer.
Jimmy Walker, 63, American basketball player (Detroit Pistons, Houston Rockets, Kansas City Kings), lung cancer.
Al Williams, 60, American basketball player, liver cancer.
Kevin Woodcock, 64, British cartoonist.
Hy Zaret, 99, American lyricist ("Unchained Melody").

3
Anne Dreydel, 89, British educationalist, co-founder of the Oxford English Centre.
Eric Gullage, 63, Canadian politician, cancer.
Beppie Noyes, 87, American author, stroke.
Claude Pompidou, 94, French widow of former Prime Minister and President Georges Pompidou.
Boots Randolph, 80, American saxophonist ("Yakety Sax"), cerebral hemorrhage.
Dave Simmons, 58, English footballer (Colchester United, Brentford).

4
Barış Akarsu, 28, Turkish rock musician, car accident.
Liane Bahler, 25, German cyclist, car accident.
José Roberto Espinosa, 59, Mexican footballer, coach and journalist, pneumonia and cancer.
Johnny Frigo, 90, American jazz violinist and bass player, complications from a fall.
Ken MacAfee, 77, American football player, heart attack.
Vivienne Nearing, 81, American lawyer involved in quiz show scandals, adrenal cancer.
Bill Pinkney, 81, American singer who was the last original member of The Drifters, probable heart attack.
X1, 28, American rapper and Onyx affiliate, suicide.
Osvaldo Romo, 70, Chilean security agent jailed for human rights abuses under Pinochet, heart and respiratory problems.
Ted Row, 84, Australian politician.
Eleanor Stewart, 94, American film and voice actor, Alzheimer's disease.
Henrique Viana, 71, Portuguese actor and singer, cancer.

5
Régine Crespin, 80, French operatic soprano, liver cancer.
Odile Crick, 86, British-born artist, widow of Francis Crick, cancer.
Kerwin Mathews, 81, American actor.
George Melly, 80, British jazz and blues musician, lung cancer.
Sylvan Shemitz, 82, United States lighting designer for Jefferson Memorial, Grand Central Terminal, heart attack.

6
Robert Frederick Carr, 63, American serial killer.
Don Mumford, 53, American jazz drummer.
Marguerite Vogt, 94, American polio and cancer researcher.
Eileen Wearne, 95, Australian athlete at the 1932 Summer Olympics and Australia's oldest surviving Olympian.
Kathleen Woodiwiss, 68, American romance writer, cancer.
Lois Wyse, 80, American advertising executive, author and columnist, stomach cancer.

7
Ion Calvocoressi, 88, British soldier and stockbroker.
Dame Anne McLaren, 80, British geneticist and developmental biologist, ex-wife of Donald Michie, car accident.
Donald Michie, 83, British researcher in artificial intelligence, ex-husband of Dame Anne McLaren, car accident.
John G. Mitchell, 75, American environment editor and author, National Geographic (1994–2004), heart attack.
Jack Odell, 87, British engineer and co-founder of Matchbox Toys.
John Szarkowski, 81, American photography curator, complications of a stroke.

8
Jindřich Feld, 82, Czech composer.
*Haroon-ul-Islam, Pakistan Army Lieutenant-Colonel, shot.
Itzik Kol, 75, Israeli film producer, pneumonia.
Chandra Shekhar, 80, Indian Prime Minister (1990–1991) and Member of Lok Sabha, multiple myeloma.
Jack B. Sowards, 78, American screenwriter (Star Trek II: The Wrath of Khan), amyotrophic lateral sclerosis.

9
Esteban Areta, 75, Spanish international footballer and coach.
John Baker, 71, Australian general, Chief of the Australian Defence Force (1995–1998).
Hans Eschenbrenner, 96, German Olympic shooter.
John Fogarty, 78, Australian rugby union winger, played two tests for the Wallabies.
John Hill, 83, American lawyer and politician, Texas Attorney General, Texas Supreme Court Chief Justice, heart condition.
Jerry Ito, 79, Japanese-American actor, pneumonia.
Charles Lane, 102, American character actor (It's a Wonderful Life, I Love Lucy), founding member of SAG.
Ralph Paffenbarger, 84, American doctor who performed an early study on the importance of exercise, heart failure.
Penny Thomson, 56, British film producer, cancer.
Peter Tuddenham, 88, British voice actor (Blake's 7).
John Wilson, 84, Irish politician, Tánaiste (1990–1993).

10
Theresa Duncan, 40, American video game designer, suicide.
Tibor Feheregyhazi, 75, Hungarian-Canadian actor and theatre director, prostate cancer.
Devin Gaines, 22, American graduate, awarded five undergraduate degrees, drowned.
Abdul Rashid Ghazi, 43, Pakistani cleric at the Red Mosque in Islamabad, shot.
Corbin Harney, 87, American Western Shoshone leader and environmental activist, complications from cancer.
Frank Kilroy, 86, American football player, scout and general manager for the New England Patriots.
Edward Lowbury, 93, British bacteriologist.
Doug Marlette, 57, American Pulitzer Prize-winning cartoonist (Kudzu), car accident.
Marjorie Morgan, 92, Canadian author, Alzheimer's disease.
Mireya Rodríguez, 70, Cuban Olympic fencer.
William Seegers, 106, German-American last veteran of World War I and California's last World War I veteran.
Zheng Xiaoyu, 62, Chinese official, former head of the State Food and Drug Administration, executed.

11
Glenda Adams, 68, Australian writer, ovarian cancer.
Shag Crawford, 90, American baseball umpire (1956–1975).
Bill Flynn, 58, South African actor, heart attack.
Livio Fongaro, 69, Italian footballer and coach.
Richard Franklin, 58, Australian film director (Roadgames), prostate cancer.
Ove Grahn, 64, Swedish footballer.
Nana Gualdi, 75, German singer and actress.
Lady Bird Johnson, 94, American First Lady of the United States (1963–1969), natural causes.
Rod Lauren, 67, American actor, suicide by jumping.
Alfonso López Michelsen, 94, Colombian President (1974–1978) and Foreign Minister (1968–1970), heart attack.
Ed Mirvish, 92, Canadian retail pioneer, natural causes.
Jimmy Skinner, 90, Canadian ice hockey coach (Detroit Red Wings).
Timothy Sprigge, 75, British idealist philosopher.
Larry Staverman, 70, American basketball player and first head coach for the Indiana Pacers (1967–1968).
Medha Yodh, 79, Indian dancer and dance teacher.

12
Marc Behm, 82, American writer.
Robert Burås, 31, Norwegian guitarist for Madrugada and My Midnight Creeps.
Mr. Butch, 56, American homeless person and local celebrity in Boston, scooter accident.
Allen Clarke, 96, British educationalist.
Nigel Dempster, 65, British journalist, progressive supranuclear palsy.
Pat Fordice, 71, American broadcaster and First Lady of Mississippi (1992–2000), cancer.
José Iglesias Fernández, 80, Spanish football player (Real Madrid), stroke.
Forbes Johnston, 35, British football player (Falkirk, Airdrieonians).
Jim Mitchell, 63, American porn producer (Behind the Green Door), heart attack.
James Shen, 98, Taiwanese diplomat, last ambassador of Taiwan to the United States.
Kesha Wizzart, 18, British singer and television show contestant, murdered.
Stan Zemanek, 60, Australian radio presenter, brain cancer.

13
Harry Fain, 88, American family lawyer, pneumonia.
Otto von der Gablentz, 76, German diplomat.
Khalid Hassan, 23, Iraqi reporter for The New York Times, shot.
Frank Maher, 78, British stuntman.
Albert Putt, 80, New Zealand cricketer.

14
Edward Boyse, 83, American physician, pneumonia.
Eva Crackles, 89, British botanist.
Nan Cross, 79, South African anti-apartheid activist.
John Ferguson, Sr., 68, Canadian hockey player, general manager, coach and scout, prostate cancer.
Bernard Pagel, British astrophysicist, cancer.
John Warrender, 2nd Baron Bruntisfield, 86, British soldier and aristocrat.

15
Bluma Appel, 86, Canadian philanthropist and patron of the arts, lung cancer.
Alberto Romão Dias, Portuguese organometallic chemist, professor at the IST.
Kelly Johnson, 49, British guitarist (Girlschool), cancer of the spine.
Kieron Moore, 82, Irish actor (The League of Gentlemen, The Day of the Triffids).
Schelto Patijn, 70, Dutch politician, mayor of Amsterdam (1994–2001).
Tsang Tsou Choi, 85, Hong Kong-based graffiti artist whose works were included in the 2003 Venice Biennale, heart disease.

16
Angus Allan, 70, British comic strip writer.
Simone Barck, 62/63, German contemporary historian and literary scholar.
Tom Brooks, 88, Australian cricketer (New South Wales) and international umpire.
Mikhail Kononov, 67, Russian actor (Guest from the Future, Siberiade, A Railway Station for Two), after long illness.
Skinny McNabb, 90, American Major League Baseball player for the Detroit Tigers.
Dmitri Prigov, 66, Russian poet, heart attack.
Alan Shepherd, 71, British motorcycle racer.
Kurt Steyrer, 87, Austrian health minister and Socialist presidential candidate, after short illness.
Sándor Krebs, 80, Hungarian Olympic cyclist.

17
Jeremy Blake, 35, American video artist, suicide by drowning.
Peter Denning, 57, British cricketer (Somerset), cancer.
Júlio Redecker, 51, Brazilian leader of the Social Democracy Party, aviation accident.
Paulo Rogério Amoretty Souza, 60, Brazilian chairman of SCI, attorney for Corinthians, aviation accident.
Teresa Stich-Randall, 79, American opera singer.

18
Wayne Downing, 67, American retired army general, meningitis.
Jerry Hadley, 55, American opera singer, suicide by gunshot.
Charles Jauncey, Baron Jauncey of Tullichettle, 82, British Law Lord.
John Kronus, 38, American professional wrestler, four-time ECW tag team champion.
Gary Lupul, 48, Canadian hockey player (Vancouver Canucks).
Sir Gordon MacWhinnie, 85, British-born Hong Kong accountant and public servant.
Orlando McFarlane, 69, Cuban Major League Baseball player.
Kenji Miyamoto, 98, Japanese politician, leader of the Japanese Communist Party for 40 years, old age.
Sekou Sundiata, 58, American poet, musician and performance artist, heart failure.
Charles Wylie, 87, British army officer and mountain climber.

19
Glen Angus, 36, Canadian game artist, heart failure.
Ivor Emmanuel, 79, British singer and actor (Zulu), stroke.
A. K. Faezul Huq, 62, Bangladeshi politician, lawyer, and freelance journalist, sudden heart failure.
Roberto Fontanarrosa, 62, Argentine cartoonist and writer, amyotrophic lateral sclerosis.
Howard Judd, 71, American women's health researcher, congestive heart failure.
Shirley Slesinger Lasswell, 84, American marketing pioneer, sued Disney over Winnie the Pooh royalties, respiratory failure.
Hector MacLean, 93, British World War II fighter pilot.
Roger Nathan, 2nd Baron Nathan, 84, British solicitor and aristocrat.
Alanah Woody, 51, American archaeologist, executive director of the Nevada Rock Art Foundation.

20
Ollie Bridewell, 21, British motorcycle racer, crash during race practice for the British Superbike Championship.
Golde Flami, 89, Argentine actress.
Tammy Faye Messner, 65, American evangelist, metastatic colon cancer.
David Preece, 44, British footballer (Luton Town), throat cancer.
Maurice Riel, 85, Canadian Senator.
Kai Siegbahn, 89, Swedish physicist at Uppsala University, won Nobel Prize in Physics in 1981.
Geoff Taylor, 84, English footballer.
Pete Wilson, 62, American broadcaster, heart attack.

21
Don Arden, 81, British rock manager, father of Sharon Osbourne.
René Deceja, 73, Uruguayan Olympic cyclist.
Jack Fearey, 84, American television pioneer, Bumbershoot festival founder.
Jesús de Polanco, 77, Spanish media entrepreneur and publisher (El País), complications of arthritic disease.
Sherwin Wine, 79, American rabbi, founder of Birmingham Temple and Humanistic Judaism movement, car accident.
Yang Xizong, 79, Chinese politician, Governor of Sichuan province and Communist Party Chief of Henan province.

22
Derek Bazalgette, 83, British admiral.
Sir John Burnett, 85, British academic, Principal of Edinburgh University (1979–1987).
Carmelo Camet, 102, Argentine 1928 Olympic bronze medalist in fencing and oldest living former Olympian.
Mike Coolbaugh, 35, American baseball first base coach for the Tulsa Drillers, head injury.
Jarrod Cunningham, 38, New Zealand rugby union footballer for London Irish, motor neurone disease.
Norma Gabler, 84, American textbook campaigner, Parkinson's disease.
Walter Jona, 81, Australian politician, member of the Victorian Legislative Assembly (1964–1985).
László Kovács, 74, Hungarian-born cinematographer (Easy Rider, Ghostbusters, Five Easy Pieces).
André Milongo, 71, Congolese Prime Minister (1991–1992).
Ulrich Mühe, 54, German actor (The Lives of Others), stomach cancer.
Jean Stablinski, 75, French cyclist.
Rollie Stiles, 100, American oldest living former Major League Baseball player.
Gerhard Thielcke, 76, German conservationist, BUND co-founder, head injury.

23
Franco Cuomo, 69, Italian writer.
Sir Tom Davis, 90, Cook Islander Prime Minister of the Cook Islands (1978–1987).
Otis Davis, 86, American Major League Baseball player for the Brooklyn Dodgers.
Ernst Otto Fischer, 88, German Nobel Prize–winning chemist.
Tor Kamata, 70, American professional wrestler (Stampede Wrestling), heart disease.
Daniel E. Koshland, Jr., 87, American scientist, editor of Science magazine (1985–1995), stroke.
Benjamin Libet, 91, American pioneering scientist in the field of human consciousness.
Ron Miller, 74, American songwriter ("Touch Me in the Morning", "For Once in My Life"), cardiac arrest.
Gyani Nand, 64, Fijian politician (FLP, 2001–2006), Minister for Agriculture (2006).
Joan O'Hara, 76, Irish actress, heart disease.
Mary Anne Scoles, 110, Canadian and Manitoban oldest verified person.
Mirsha Serrano, 28, Mexican footballer for Tecos UAG, car accident.
George Tabori, 93, Hungarian-born British theater director.
Mohammed Zahir Shah, 92, Afghan royal, last king of Afghanistan.

24
Giorgio Anglesio, 85, Italian Olympic fencer.
Eric Davis, 75, English footballer (Plymouth Argyle).
Albert Ellis, 93, American pioneer in cognitive-behavioral therapy, kidney and heart failure.
Chaney Kley, 34, American actor (The Shield, Darkness Falls, Legally Blonde), drug overdose.
Abdullah Mehsud, 31, Pakistani Taliban commander, suicide by hand grenade.
Geoffrey Nuttall, 95, British historian and Nonconformist minister.
Edward J. Sullivan, 86, American Clerk of Courts for Middlesex County, Massachusetts.
Charles Whiting, 80, British author and military historian.
William Young, 107, British airman, last known remaining World War I veteran of the Royal Flying Corps.
Nicola Zaccaria, 84, Greek operatic bass, Alzheimer's disease.

25
Bae Hyung-kyu, 42, South Korean pastor, Taliban hostage, shot.
Danny Bergara, 64, Uruguayan football manager of Stockport County and Brunei, stroke.
Raymond Bristow, 98, British priest, longest-serving Anglican minister.
Jake, 12, American search and rescue dog for September 11, 2001 attacks and Hurricane Katrina, cancer.
Bernd Jakubowski, 54, German footballer (East Germany), after short illness.
Jesse Marunde, 27, American strongman, heart attack.

26
George Brown, 65, Belizean Chief Justice (1990–1998), illness.
Lars Forssell, 79, Swedish author and member of the Swedish Academy.
Eleanor Josephine Macdonald, 101, American cancer researcher.
John Normington, 70, British actor (Atonement, Doctor Who, Rollerball), pancreatic cancer.
Skip Prosser, 56, American college basketball coach for Wake Forest University, heart attack.
Shambo, 6, British Hindu sacred bull, lethal injection due to bovine tuberculosis.
Alberto Villamizar, 62, Colombian politician (NL) and diplomat, complications of lung surgery.

27
Gabriel Cisneros, 66, Spanish politician (PP), co-author of the 1978 Constitution, complications from stroke.
Lucky Grills, 79, Australian comedian and actor (Bluey).
Fannie Hillsmith, 96, American Cubist painter.
Abdullah Kurshumi, 75, Yemeni politician, Prime Minister of the Yemen Arab Republic (1969–1970).
James Oyebola, 46, British heavyweight boxer, shot.
Alan Pottasch, 79, American advertising executive for Pepsi, developed Pepsi Generation ad campaign.
Christophe Ruer, 42, French Olympic modern pentathlete (1988, 1992, 1996), motorcycle accident.
William J. Tuttle, 95, American Oscar-winning make-up artist (North by Northwest, Singin' in the Rain, Cat on a Hot Tin Roof).

28
*Crown Prince Bảo Long, 71, Vietnamese son of the last Emperor Bảo Đại.
Kazi Lhendup Dorjee, 102, Indian first chief minister of Sikkim (SNC, 1974–1978), heart attack.
Karl Gotch, 82, German-born professional wrestler.
Isidore Isou, 82, French poet, film critic and artist.
Jim LeRoy, 46, American stunt pilot, air crash.
Sal Mosca, 80, American jazz pianist and educator.

29
Ian Anstruther, 85, British diplomat, baronet, writer and literary patron.
Jack Cole, 87, American publisher (Cole Directory), cancer.
James David, 79, American football player (Detroit Lions), after long illness.
Art Davis, 73, American jazz double-bassist, heart attack.
Phil Drabble, 93, British television presenter (One Man and His Dog).
Mike Reid, 67, British comedian and actor (EastEnders, Snatch), heart attack.
Bill Robinson, 64, American baseball player (Braves, Yankees, Phillies and Pirates) and coach.
Michel Serrault, 79, French actor (La Cage aux Folles), cancer.
Tom Snyder, 71, American talk show host and journalist, complications of leukemia.
Marvin Zindler, 85, American reporter, pancreatic cancer.

30
Michelangelo Antonioni, 94, Italian film director (L'avventura, Blowup, Zabriskie Point).
Teoctist Arăpaşu, 92, Romanian Patriarch of the Romanian Orthodox Church, heart attack.
Ingmar Bergman, 89, Swedish stage and film director (The Seventh Seal, Wild Strawberries, Fanny and Alexander).
Fausto Sucena Rasga Filho, 78, Brazilian Olympic basketball player.
Thomas McGraw, 54, British mobster, heart attack.
Ali Meshkini, 86, Iranian Chairman of the Assembly of Experts, respiratory and kidney complications.
Anne O'Brien, 95, American Olympic athlete.
Makoto Oda, 75, Japanese writer and anti-war activist, cancer.
Shim Sung-Min, 29, South Korean Taliban hostage, shot.
Richard Stott, 63, British newspaper editor and author, pancreatic cancer.
Bill Walsh, 75, American three-time Super Bowl-winning football coach of the San Francisco 49ers and member of the Pro Football Hall of Fame, leukemia.
Wen Xingyu, 65, Chinese comedian, lung cancer.

31
Margaret Avison, 89, Canadian poet.
J. Esmonde Barry, 83, Canadian healthcare activist and political commentator, complications from a heart attack.
Norman Cohn, 92, British historian, degenerative heart condition.
Oliver Morgan, 74, American rhythm & blues vocalist, heart attack.
R. D. Wingfield, 79, British writer and radio dramatist.

References

2007-07
 07